Jepson Prairie is a remnant natural prairie in the Sacramento Valley of the U.S. state of California, surrounded by land used in agriculture. The prairie is managed by the University of California, Davis, the Solano Land Trust, and the Nature Conservancy. The current reserve director is Virginia "Shorty" Boucher.

References

External links 
 - UC Davis
 - Solano Land Trust
 Plants found at Jepson Prairie
 Topographic map of Jepson Prairie
 Weather at Jepson Prairie

University of California, Davis
Nature Conservancy preserves
Sacramento Valley
Grasslands of California